Seyu Khosavi Anqolab (also Romanized as Seyū Khosavī Ānqolāb; also known as Seyū Khosavī Morādkhān and So’ūkhsū-ye Morādkhān) is a village in Gholaman Rural District, Raz and Jargalan District, Bojnord County, North Khorasan Province, Iran. At the 2006 census, its population was 633, in 147 families.

References 

Populated places in Bojnord County